The Partnach is an  mountain river in Bavaria, Germany.

The Partnach is fed by meltwaters from the Schneeferner glacier some  higher up. The glacier's meltwaters seep into the karsty bedrock and reach the surface again near the source of the Partnach.

The Partnach then flows down the Reintal valley. Until 2005 there were two mountain lakes here – the Vordere Blaue Gumpe and the Hintere Blaue Gumpe. At the first lake the water of the Partnach was impounded by scree from rock slides. As a result of heavy rain the natural dam, caused by rockfalls, was partially carried away and the lake was completed filled with sediment. As a result, the Blaue Gumpe does not exist any longer today.

Tributaries 
The Partnach has the following tributaries which join it at or near the river kilometre shown in brackets:
Kanker (0.9)
Boddenberggraben (3.2)
Hornschlittengraben (4.1)
Eselsberggraben (4.4)
Wildsaugraben (4.7)
Graseckgraben (4.8)
Streichlagraben (4.9)
Ferchenbach (6.0 )
Sulzgraben (7.8 )
Klausengraben (8.2)
Bodenlaine (8.3)
Spitzwaldgraben (8.5)
Ferlsbach (9.3 )
Reintalbach (11.1)

Gallery

See also
List of rivers of Bavaria

Sources 
 David Morche: Untersuchungen zum fluvialen Sedimenttransport in Einzugsgebieten der nördlichen Kalkalpen (Reintal/Wettersteingebirge und Lahnenwiesgraben/Ammergauer Alpen)

References

Rivers of Bavaria
Rivers of Germany